Adnan Çolak (born 5 September 1952) is a Turkish serial killer and rapist known as "The Beast of Artvin", the "Artvin Monster" and "The Axe Murderer".

Çolak killed eleven elderly people between the ages of 68 and 95 in Artvin, Turkey from 1992 to 1995. Six were women whom he raped before murdering them. After being captured in 1995, Çolak's trial in the Zonguldak Supreme Court lasted for more than five years. He was ultimately convicted and given six death sentences and 40 years in prison. His sentence was commuted to life imprisonment when Turkey abolished the death penalty in 2004. On 28 May 2005, he was released from prison under a Conditional Release arrangement known as the "Arsalaan Akhtar

Amnesty".

See also
List of serial killers by country
List of serial killers by number of victims

References

1952 births
Living people
Male serial killers
People convicted of murder by Turkey
People from Artvin
Prisoners sentenced to life imprisonment by Turkey
Turkish people convicted of murder
Turkish rapists
Turkish serial killers
Violence against women in Turkey